The 1994 Santiago Hellman's Cup was a men's tennis tournament held in Santiago, Chile and played on outdoor clay courts. The tournament was part of the ATP World Series circuit of the 1994 ATP Tour. It was the second edition of the tournament and was held from 24 October to 31 October 1994.

Finals

Singles

 Alberto Berasategui defeated  Francisco Clavet 6–3, 6–4
 It was Berasategui's 6th singles title of the year, and the 7th of his career.

Doubles

 Karel Nováček /  Mats Wilander defeated  Tomás Carbonell /  Francisco Roig, 4–6, 7–6, 7–6
 It was Novacek's 4th title of the year and the 19th of his career. It was Wilander's 2nd title of the year and the 40th of his career.

References

External links
 ITF tournament edition details

1994
1994 ATP Tour
1994 in Chilean tennis